The Greater Love is a 1913 American silent short drama film, directed by Allan Dwan, and starring Charlotte Burton and Mabel Brown and Edward Coxen.

External links

1913 drama films
1913 films
Silent American drama films
American silent short films
American black-and-white films
1913 short films
Films directed by Allan Dwan
1910s American films